Carlos Alberto Morban Rivera (born April 25, 1982 in Santo Domingo) is a professional basketball player from the Dominican Republic. He is a 6 ft 2 in (1.88 m) and 190 lb (93 kg) guard who last played professionally for Mexican team Lobos Grises UAD.

High school
In 2000, Carlos Morban led Miami Christian School to a state championship.

College career
Morban was a three-year starter at Florida International University.  In 80 games over three seasons, he averaged 9.8 points, 3.5 rebounds, 2.8 assists, and 2.5 steals per game. His best season was his junior year (2003–04), when he averaged 12 points per game for the Golden Panthers. He left after his junior season to begin his professional career.

Professional career
Morban was not drafted to the NBA and began his career with PBC CSKA Sofia in the Bulgarian National Basketball League.  Since then, Morban has played professionally in Turkey, Macedonia, Romania, the Dominican Republic, and Mexico.  He played for PBC CSKA Sofia and Bosnian team HKK Široki in the EuroChallenge, in 2005 and 2008, respectively.  He currently plays for Lobos Grises UAD in the Mexican Liga Nacional de Baloncesto Profesional.

National team career
Morban also plays internationally for the Dominican Republic national basketball team.  He first played for the senior team at the 2007 CBC Championship, helping the Dominicans to the silver medal and automatic qualification to 2008 Centrobasket.  At the Centrobasket tournament, he helped the Dominicans to a bronze medal to qualify for the FIBA Americas Championship 2009, where he again played for the team.  He previously played for the fourth place Dominican team at the 2001 FIBA World Championship for Young Men.

References

External links
 at basketball.latinbasket.com
 at espn.go.com
 at basketball.realgm.com

1982 births
Living people
Basketball players at the 2003 Pan American Games
Dominican Republic expatriate basketball people in Bosnia and Herzegovina
Dominican Republic expatriate basketball people in Bulgaria
Dominican Republic expatriate basketball people in Kosovo
Dominican Republic expatriate basketball people in Mexico
Dominican Republic expatriate basketball people in North Macedonia
Dominican Republic expatriate basketball people in Romania
Dominican Republic men's basketball players
FIU Panthers men's basketball players
HKK Široki players
Huracanes del Atlántico players
KB Peja players
KK Vardar players
Lobos Grises UAD players
Pan American Games silver medalists for the Dominican Republic
Pan American Games medalists in basketball
Point guards
Shooting guards
Medalists at the 2003 Pan American Games